The following lists events during 2002 in Saudi Arabia.

Incumbents
Monarch: Fahd
Crown Prince: Abdullah

Events

March
 March 11 - All Gulf states back up with Saudi Arabia's peace plan for Israel.

References

 
Years of the 21st century in Saudi Arabia
2000s in Saudi Arabia
Saudi Arabia
Saudi Arabia